Armand Amar (born 1953) is a French composer, who grew up in Morocco. He won the 2008 César Award for Best Music for Le Concert (Radu Mihăileanu).

Life and career
Armand Amar is a French composer living in Paris. In 1968, he began playing the congas. He also practiced the tabla and the zarb in the following years.

In 1976 he met South African choreographer Peter Goss, who introduced him to dance. In the subsequent years, he worked with a number of choreographers in contemporary dance.

His works are focused particularly on Eastern music. He is the author of several ballets and soundtracks films such as The Trail, Days of Glory, Live and Become, The First Cry, Earth from Above, Bab'Aziz and Home. Since Amen., he has also collaborated with Costa-Gavras scoring all of his subsequent films.

He founded the label Long Distance in 1994 with his partners Alain Weber and Peter Gabriel.

Compositions

Films

 2002: Amen. by Costa-Gavras
 2004: Earth from Above by Renaud Delourme
 2004: Tabous (Zohre & Manouchehr) by Mitra Farahani
 2005: Live and Become by Radu Mihăileanu
 2005: The Axe by Costa-Gavras
 2006: La Piste by Éric Valli
 2006: Bab'Aziz by Nacer Khémir
 2006: Days of Glory by Rachid Bouchareb
 2006: Blame It on Fidel by Julie Gavras
 2007: Cartouches gauloises by Mehdi Charef
 2007: The Colonel by Laurent Herbiet
 2007: Le Premier Cri by Gilles de Maistre
 2007: Comme ton père by Marco Carmel
 2008: La Jeune Fille et les Loups by Gilles Legrand
 2008: Sagan by Diane Kurys
 2009: Welcome by Philippe Lioret
 2009: Eden Is West by Costa-Gavras
 2009: Moi, Van Gogh by Peter Knapp and François Bertrand
 2009: Home by Yann Arthus-Bertrand
 2009: Le Concert by Radu Mihăileanu
 2009: London River de Rachid Bouchareb
 2010: Comme les cinq doigts de la main by Alexandre Arcady
 2010: Ao, le dernier Néandertal by Jacques Malaterre
 2010: Hors la loi by Rachid Bouchareb
 2011: You Will Be My Son by Gilles Legrand
 2011: Les Hommes libres by Ismaël Ferroukhi
 2011: The Source by Radu Mihăileanu
 2012: Ce que le jour doit à la nuit by Alexandre Arcady
 2012: Capital by Costa-Gavras
 2012: Mon bel oranger by Marcos Bernstein
 2012: Planète Océan by Yann Arthus-Bertrand and Michael Pitiot
 2012: Amazonia Eterna by Belisario Franca
 2013: For a Woman by Diane Kurys
 2013: Belle and Sebastian by Nicolas Vanier
 2013: A Thousand Times Good Night by Erik Poppe
2014: Red Line by Andrea Kalinl
 2014: The Nightingale by Philippe Muyl
 2014: 24 jours by Alexandre Arcady
 2014: Cartoonists - Foot Soldiers of Democracy by Stéphanie Valloatto
 2015: L'Odeur de la mandarine by Gilles Legrand
 2015: Belle & Sebastian: The Adventure Continues by Christian Dugay
 2015: Human by Yann Arthus-Bertrand
 2015: Lake Como by Yann Arthus-Bertrand
 2016: The History of Love by Radu Mihăileanu
 2017: L'école buissonnière by Nicolas Vanier

Television
 1997: Miracle in the Eldorado (Philippe Niang)
 2006: Earth from Above (Yann Arthus-Bertrand)
 2007: Marie Humbert, the secret of a parent (Marc Angelo)
 2009: Great Reporters (Gilles de Maistre)
 2009: London River (Rachid Bouchareb)
 2010: Marion Mazzano (Marc Angelo)
 2011: Voir le pays du matin calme (Gilles de Maistre)
 2013: Crime d'état (Pierre Aknine)
 2014: Ce soir je vais tuer l'assassin de mon fils (Pierre Aknine)
 2014: Jusqu'au dernier (François Velle)
 2015: No Second Chance (François Velle)

Other creations
 1976 à 1991: musiques de ballet pour le chorégraphe sud-africain Peter Goss
1976: "Entre l'air et l'eau" au théâtre des Champs-Élysées, puis est présentée au Festival d'Avignon et au Festival d'Apt.
1978: "Sable mouvant" est créé au Théâtre des Champs-Élysées.
1979: "A transformation mystery" au Théâtre de la Bastille puis au Festival de Vienne.
1980: "Quatuor et Side by side" au Théâtre Mogador
1981: "Marécage" au Théâtre de la Porte Saint-Martin, Festival de Montpellier, Festival de Toulon, Festival d'Annecy, Festival de la Culture Juive.
1982: "Below and Above"; créé dans le cadre du Festival des Bouffes du Nord.
1983: "L'aube portée par les ailes du vent"; Théâtre de la porte Saint-Martin – Festival de Turin.
1984: "Ties" pour le Théâtre des Amandiers à Nanterre
1985: "Seajoy et Gamos" dans le cadre du Festival d'Automne au Centre Georges Pompidou
1986: "Aller-retour" et "Y"; Festival de Turin, Tournées en Argentine, Espagne, Italie, Allemagne.
1987: "Steellight" ;Biennale du Val-de-Marne.
1988: "Le Pouvoir du silence"; Festival Vignale Danza.
1989: "Circumanbulatoire" à Choisy-le-Roi. Tournées en Italie et à la Réunion.
1990: "Le Poids des anges"; Festival de Caseres.
1991: "Arbre de pluie"; Allemagne, Italie, Belgique...
 1987 à 1998: Musiques pour des spectacles de la Cathédrale d'Images aux Baux-de-Provence (ces 5 spectacles ont été réalisés par Hans-Walter Müller): 
 1987: Hymne à la Vie
 1992: Les Portes de l'Europe	
 1993: Les Forêts de l'Espoir	
 1995: L'Or des Alpilles
 1997: Images Paroles du Monde
1992: "The Other Side" au Conservatoire national supérieur de Paris
1994 à 1996: "Nomades Dance" et "Paroles d'Anges" avec les musiciens du Rajasthan et les gitans de Perpignan pour Montpellier danse et la biennale de Lyon
1997 à 2001: création pour Philippe Talard au théâtre national de Mannheim
2005: Inanna, un ballet de Carolyn Carlson
 2006: Souviens toi de Marie-Claude Pietragalla et Julien Derouault
 2009: Marco Polo de Marie-Claude Pietragalla et Julien Derouault
 2010: Bande annonce du Printemps du cinéma (extrait de la bande son du film Le Premier Cri).
 2010: Bande annonce de La rentrée du cinéma (extrait de la bande son du film La Jeune Fille et les Loups).
 2011: Leylâ et Majnűn, ou l'amour mystique; oratorio Mundi pour 40 musiciens et chanteurs. Il est interprété au Festival de Fès des Musiques Sacrées du Monde le 3 juin 2011 et à la Salle Pleyel en avril 2014.
 2014: Falen pour le Ballet Boy, danse
 2014: Steel par Russel Maliphant, danse
 2014: pixel par Mourad Merzouki, danse

Awards

Awards
 2009: IFMCA Award for Best Original Score for a Documentary Feature Film for Home (Yann Arthus-Bertrand)
 2010: Gopo Award for Best Music for Le Concert (Radu Mihăileanu)
 2010: César Award for Best Original Music for Le Concert (Radu Mihăileanu)
 2014: Amanda Award for Best Score for A Thousand Times Good Night (Erik Poppe)

Nominations
 2003: César Award for Best Original Music for Amen. (Costa-Gavras)
 2006: César Award for Best Original Music for Live and Become (Radu Mihăileanu)
 2007: César Award for Best Original Music for Days of Glory (Rachid Bouchareb)
 2007: IFMCA Award for Best Original Score for a Documentary Feature Film for Le premier cri (Gilles de Maistre)
 2015: IFMCA Award for Best Original Score for a Documentary for Human (Yann Arthus-Bertrand)

References

External links

 
 

1953 births
Living people
French film score composers
Moroccan emigrants to France
Erato Records artists